A toothbrush sanitizer is a device used to disinfect the tooth brush by applying short-wavelength ultraviolet (UV-C) light to kill or inactivate microorganisms. Studies in dental journals demonstrate that UV sanitizers effectively kill bacteria and microorganisms, but other forms of sanitizing, using common household products, were found to be equally or more successful at eliminating microorganisms from toothbrushes.

See also
 Ultraviolet germicidal irradiation

Further reading
 "Start-up readies a killer device for toothbrushes" by George Lazarus, Chicago Tribune (Jan 19, 2000)
 "Zapping That Icky Toothbrush" by Brendan I. Koerner, The New York Times (Jan 16, 2005)
 "Man vs. toothbrush: Should we be afraid?" by Karen Klages, Chicago Tribune (Feb 27, 2005)
 "Housewares industry looks to arm against domestic threats" by Jura Koncius, The Washington Post (April 8, 2006)
 "Health Products Exposed" by Dena Braun, Reno Gazette-Journal (Aug 4, 2007)
 America Brushes Up: The Use and Marketing of Toothpaste and Toothbrushes in the Twentieth Century by Kerry Segrave, McFarland & Company (2010)

References

Oral hygiene
Containers